Sandro Hiroshi Parreão Oi (born 19 November 1979) is a Brazilian former professional footballer.

He played domestically for Tocantinópolis, Rio Branco, São Paulo, Flamengo, Figueirense, Guarani, América RN, Santo André and Red Bull Brasil, in the United Arab Emirates for Al-Jazira, and for South Korean clubs Daegu FC, Chunnam Dragons and Suwon Bluewings.

External links
 
 
 

1979 births
Living people
Association football forwards
Brazilian footballers
Brazilian expatriate footballers
Rio Branco Esporte Clube players
São Paulo FC players
CR Flamengo footballers
Figueirense FC players
Al Jazira Club players
Guarani FC players
Daegu FC players
Jeonnam Dragons players
Suwon Samsung Bluewings players
América Futebol Clube (RN) players
Esporte Clube Santo André players
Red Bull Brasil players
K League 1 players
Expatriate footballers in the United Arab Emirates
Expatriate footballers in South Korea
Brazilian expatriate sportspeople in South Korea
Brazilian people of Japanese descent
Tocantinópolis Esporte Clube players
UAE Pro League players
Sportspeople from Tocantins